The 1940 Connecticut Huskies football team represented the University of Connecticut in the 1940 college football season.  The Huskies were led by seventh-year head coach J. Orlean Christian and completed the season with a record of 4–4.

Schedule

References

Connecticut
UConn Huskies football seasons
Connecticut Huskies football